Sig ( Sīq; called Saint-Denis-de-Sig under French rule) is a town in northwestern Algeria. Formerly located in  Oran Province and now located in Mascara Province, north-western Algeria. Its population was 61,373 in 2008.

The town's public garden is on the bank of the Sig River just down stream the confluence of the le-Mebtoûh and the Matarah. The local land supports the growing of olives, cotton, flax, grains, tobacco, and wine, much of which is processed locally and exported. The other local industry is mineral mining, primarily for diatomite.

The temperatures usually rise from May to the end of August.

Notable people
Rachid Taha (1958–2018), musician (birthplace)

See also 

 Battle of Sig

Notes

References
 

Communes of Oran Province
Cities in Algeria
Algeria